Felipe Borges Dutra Ribeiro (born 4 May 1985) is a Brazilian handball player for US Créteil Handball and the Brazilian national team.

He participated at the 2008 Summer Olympics, where the Brazilian team placed 11th.

Awards and recognition
 Clubs
Coupe de France: 2016
Coupe de la Ligue: 2016
Individual
 All-Star Left Wing of the Pan American Championship:
2012, 2016

References

External links

Profile – UOL 

1985 births
Living people
People from São Bernardo do Campo
Brazilian male handball players
Olympic handball players of Brazil
Handball players at the 2008 Summer Olympics
Expatriate handball players
Brazilian expatriate sportspeople in France
Brazilian expatriate sportspeople in Portugal
Brazilian expatriate sportspeople in Spain
Liga ASOBAL players
CB Ademar León players
Montpellier Handball players
Pan American Games silver medalists for Brazil
Handball players at the 2007 Pan American Games
Handball players at the 2011 Pan American Games
Handball players at the 2015 Pan American Games
Handball players at the 2019 Pan American Games
Pan American Games medalists in handball
Pan American Games gold medalists for Brazil
Pan American Games bronze medalists for Brazil
South American Games gold medalists for Brazil
South American Games medalists in handball
Competitors at the 2018 South American Games
Medalists at the 2007 Pan American Games
Medalists at the 2019 Pan American Games
Medalists at the 2011 Pan American Games
Medalists at the 2015 Pan American Games
Handball players at the 2020 Summer Olympics
Sportspeople from São Paulo (state)
21st-century Brazilian people